Dihydrolanosterol, or 24,25-Dihydrolanosterol, also called Lanostenol, is a sterol and the C24-25 hydrogenated products of lanosterol, dihydrolanosterol can be demethylated by mammal or yeast cytochrome P450 sterol 14alpha-demethylase.

See also
 Lanosterol
 Obtusifoliol 
 Cycloartenol

References

sterols